Aspland is a surname. Notable people with the surname include:

Marc Aspland, British sports photographer
Robert Aspland (1782–1845), English Unitarian minister, editor and activist
Robert Brook Aspland (1805–1869), English Unitarian minister and editor; son of the above

See also
Aspland Island, South Shetland Islands, Antarctica